Omu Peak is a mountain peak of the Bucegi Mountains in Romania. It is located in Brașov, Dâmbovița and Prahova counties.

The top of Omu Peak is flat and sprawling; there is a weather station and a tourist shelter (Romanian cabana) Omu (2505 m above sea level), which is the highest mountain shelter in the entire Carpathians. The first wooden shelter was built in 1888 on the initiative of the Transylvanian Carpathian Society. Rebuilt many times, it is now as a stone and wooden building, it offers 30 beds and a buffet. The hostel does not have electricity and running water. It is open from March to November.

The top of the mountain is a rock, several meters, which is probably why different sources indicate different heights of the summit at 2505, 2507 and 2514 m above sea level.

References 

Mountains of Romania
Mountains of the Southern Carpathians
Geography of Brașov County
Geography of Dâmbovița County
Geography of Prahova County